Little Mountain may mean:

Places

United States
Little Mountain (Ohio)
Little Mountain (South Carolina), a mountain
Little Mountain, South Carolina, a town named for it
Little Mountain Historic District
Little Mountain (Tennessee)
Little Mountain Pictograph Site, Virginia
Little Mountain, a mountain and eponymous neighborhood in San Bernardino, California
Little Mountain fire, October 2007 wildfire
Little Mountain fire, 2017 wildfire

Elsewhere
Little Mountain (British Columbia) in Vancouver, Canada
Little Mountain Sound Studios, a Vancouver recording facility
Riley Park–Little Mountain, neighborhood
Vancouver-Little Mountain, defunct electoral district
Little Mountain, Queensland, a suburb of Australia's Sunshine Coast

Music
Little Mountain (album) (2012), the third studio album from Said the Whale